Milivoje Novaković (born 18 May 1979) is a Slovenian former professional footballer who played as a forward.

Club career
Novaković spent his youth career at Olimpija where he remained until the age of 19, when he was forced to leave and look for the opportunity to play professional football elsewhere as he was written off by the club officials who considered him unpromising and too skinny for a forward. Many years later, at the height of his playing career, Novaković revealed that people at Olimpija demanded money in order to promote him to the main squad.

He then went to play football for lower tier Austrian clubs where he rose to prominence, eventually signing with professional sides SV Mattersburg and LASK. In 2005, he signed with the Bulgarian top division side Litex Lovech and immediately established himself as one of their top players scoring 16 goals in 24 appearances during the 2005–06 season, earning the title of the league's top goalscorer. During the same season Litex Lovech qualified to the group stage of the 2005–06 UEFA Cup, where Novaković scored two of the clubs's four goals, helping the Bulgarian side in reaching the Round of 32 where they were eliminated by French side Strasbourg with the score 0–2 on aggregate.

During the summer of 2006 he was linked with several different clubs (e.g. German team 1. FC Köln, Israeli team Beitar Jerusalem and Bulgarian champions Levski Sofia) but despite his wish to continue his career in a different club he started, with three goals on three league appearances, the 2006–07 season with Litex Lovech who faced Koper from Slovenia and AC Omonia from Cyprus in the qualifying rounds of the 2006–07 UEFA Cup. However, Novaković's wish to leave the club was granted in late August 2006 when he joined German side 1. FC Köln for around €1.5 million.

In his first season in Germany Novaković quickly established himself in the first team and eventually finished the season with ten goals in 25 2. Bundesliga appearances, finishing the season second on the club's top scorers list. During his second season with Köln he scored 20 goals in 33 league appearances and became the top goalscorer of the 2. Bundesliga, helping his side reach the elite Bundesliga. During the 2008–09 season, he was again Köln's top goalscorer with 16 Bundesliga goals to his name. On 12 September 2008, coach Christoph Daum made him captain of the first team squad, however in late November 2009, he lost his captaincy due to a dispute with Köln's new manager Zvonimir Soldo. The 2010–11 season was his best season in the Bundesliga as Köln finished 10th on the league table with Novaković scoring 17 goals, finishing the season on third place in the league's top scorer's list. Novaković was Köln's top scorer in three of the club's four Bundesliga seasons, during his spell at the club, scoring 44 goals in 108 appearances. After finishing the next season on 17th place Köln was relegated and during the summer of 2012 the club officials decided to cut costs of the first team before the start of the season in the second tier.

Novaković was one of the players whose contract expenses were too high and on 1 August 2012, he joined J1 League side Omiya Ardija, on loan until December 2012. After the end of the loan, Novaković returned to Cologne and stayed fit with an individual training program. On 26 January 2013, the loan was eventually renewed through 31 December 2013. In 2014 Novaković signed a two-year deal with another J League side Shimizu S Pulse. After one year, he moved to Nagoya Grampus, but he was released after only one season.

On 18 February 2016, he signed a one-and-a-half-year contract with Slovenian club NK Maribor.

International career
Novaković was a member of the Slovenia national team between 2006 and 2017, scoring 32 goals in 80 appearances. He scored his first international goals on 31 May 2006 against Trinidad and Tobago, when he scored all three goals for Slovenia in a 3–1 win. He retired from international football on 13 February 2012, saying he wanted to focus on club football. However, in January 2013 he said that he is ready to play for the national football team once again. On 11 October 2013, he scored a hat-trick against Norway in the 2014 FIFA World Cup qualifications.

Career statistics

International 
Scores and results list Slovenia's goal tally first, score column indicates score after each Novaković goal.

Honours
Maribor
Slovenian PrvaLiga: 2016–17
Slovenian Football Cup: 2015–16

Individual
Bulgarian A PFG top scorer: 2005–06 (16 goals)
2. Bundesliga top scorer: 2007–08 (20 goals)
Slovenian Footballer of the Year: 2008

See also
Slovenian international players

References

External links

 
 
 Player profile at NZS 
 
 

1979 births
Living people
Slovenian people of Serbian descent
Footballers from Ljubljana
Slovenian footballers
Slovenia international footballers
Association football forwards
Slovenian expatriate footballers
SV Mattersburg players
LASK players
PFC Litex Lovech players
1. FC Köln players
Omiya Ardija players
Shimizu S-Pulse players
Nagoya Grampus players
NK Maribor players
Austrian Regionalliga players
Austrian Football Bundesliga players
2. Liga (Austria) players
First Professional Football League (Bulgaria) players
2. Bundesliga players
Bundesliga players
J1 League players
Slovenian PrvaLiga players
Slovenian expatriate sportspeople in Austria
Expatriate footballers in Austria
Slovenian expatriate sportspeople in Bulgaria
Expatriate footballers in Bulgaria
Slovenian expatriate sportspeople in Germany
Expatriate footballers in Germany
Slovenian expatriate sportspeople in Japan
Expatriate footballers in Japan
2010 FIFA World Cup players